Robert Keith Middlemas (1935–2013) was an English historian, known for works on modern European political history.

Life
Middlemas was born in Alnwick, Northumberland on 26 May 1935. He was educated at Stowe School and then joined the Northumberland Fusiliers, before entering Pembroke College, Cambridge, graduating with a first class degree in history.

Entering the Civil Service, Middlemas worked as a House of Commons clerk for nine years. From 1967 he was a lecturer at the University of Sussex. He became a reader there in 1976, and Professor in 1986.

Middlemas published 21 books. 

He died at West Burton, Sussex on 10 July 2013.

Bibliography 
Middlemas published 21 books:

Political Biographies 

 The Life and Times of Edward VII (1972)
 Baldwin: A Biography (1969), co-written with John Barnes
 The Life And Times Of George VI (1974)

European Politics 

 Orchestrating Europe: The Informal Politics Of The European Union, 1973 95

 Diplomacy of Illusion: The British Government and Germany, 1937-1939 (1972)

 Politics in Industrial Society: The Experience of the British System Since 1911 (1979)
 Power and the Party: Changing Faces of Communism in Western Europe (1980)

Other 

 Continental Coloured Glass (1971)
 Antique Colored Glass
 Power, Competition And The State (1971)
 Cabora Bassa: Engineering And Politics In Southern Africa (1975)
 The Double Market: Art Theft And Art Thieves (1975)
 Pursuit of Pleasure: High Society in the 1900s (1977)
 As They Really Were: The Citizens of Alnwick 1831 (2012)
 Industry, Unions and Government: Twenty-One Years of Nedc (1983)
 Kinship and Survival: The Middlemas Name Through 600 Years (1990)

References

1935 births
2013 deaths
English historians
People from Alnwick
People from Chichester District
Alumni of Pembroke College, Cambridge
People educated at Stowe School